Kevin Chief is a Canadian politician, who was elected to the Legislative Assembly of Manitoba in the 2011 election. He represented the electoral district of Point Douglas from 2011 to 2017 as a member of the New Democratic Party caucus.

In 2010, Chief was named a recipient of the Future Leaders of Manitoba award in the community service category. Other notable recipients include indigenous activist Michael Redhead Champagne, Canadian filmmaker and director Adam Smoluk, community leader Hannah Pratt, surgeon and university associate professor Dr. Jordan Hochman, president of Manitoba SwimAbility Cameron Krisko, and young philanthropist Ben Sabic.

Political career
Chief ran for a seat to the House of Commons of Canada in a by-election held on November 29, 2010. The election was hotly contested between Chief, who ran under the federal NDP banner, and former Manitoba MLA Kevin Lamoureux, who ran under the federal Liberal banner. On election night, Chief finished a close second behind Lamoureux in the field of seven candidates.

After his defeat, Chief opted not to run for a second time federally, instead going for a provincial Manitoba NDP nomination. He ran in the electoral district of Point Douglas in the 2011 Manitoba general election and won, defeating four other candidates to hold the seat for his party and win his first term in the Legislative Assembly of Manitoba. On January 13, 2011, he was made minister responsible for the newly created Department of Children and Youth Opportunities.

On November 3, 2014, Chief was appointed as Minister of Jobs and the Economy after the resignation of then-Minister Theresa Oswald, along with four other ministers, resigned from cabinet over concerns about Premier Greg Selinger's leadership.

Chief retained his seat in the 2016 general election and was touted as a leading candidate to succeed Selinger as NDP leader. However, he announced in September 2016 that he would not run for the leadership of the party.

He announced in December 2016 that he would resign his seat in the legislature for family reasons. His resignation became official on January 9, 2017.

Electoral record

| style="text-align:left;" colspan="2"|Liberal gain from New Democrats
|align="right"|

References

External links
 

First Nations politicians
Living people
New Democratic Party candidates for the Canadian House of Commons
New Democratic Party of Manitoba MLAs
Politicians from Winnipeg
1974 births
Members of the Executive Council of Manitoba
21st-century Canadian politicians
Métis politicians
Canadian Métis people